The Miss Hong Kong 2010 pageant was held in the Hong Kong Coliseum on August 1, 2010. Ten delegates completed for the title. The winner was Toby Chan, who competed at Miss World 2011 and Miss Chinese International 2010. The first runner-up was Sammi Cheung, and she represented Hong Kong in the Miss International 2010 pageant. The second runner-up was Lisa Ch'ng.

Results

Placements

Special awards
Miss Photogenic: #9 Crystal Li
Miss International Goodwill: #13 Toby Chan
Miss Tourism Ambassador: #13 Toby Chan
Miss Trendy Vision: #12 Ria Tong

Contestant list

Post-Pageant Notes
 Toby Chan placed Top 6 in Miss Chinese International Pageant 2010 in Tianjin, China.
 Sammi Cheung unplaced in Miss World 2010 in Sanya, China. She replace Toby Chan to complete due to a schedule conflict of competing in Miss Chinese International Pageant 2010.
 Crystal Li unplaced in Miss International 2010 in Chengdu, China. She replaced Lisa Ch'ng as the visa problem.

References

Miss Hong Kong Pageants